SBF Visa Group is an Italian company known for its amusement rides and roller coaster designing. SBF was founded in 1952 by Italo Frison, who initially constructed bumper cars and then children's rides.

List of roller coasters

As of 2021, SBF Visa Group has built 324 roller coasters around the world.

Other attractions

References

External links
 
 Listing of SBF Visa Group at the Roller Coaster DataBase

Amusement ride manufacturers
Roller coaster manufacturers